Is the Order a Rabbit? is a 2014 anime television series produced by White Fox based on the manga of the same name written by Koi and serialized in Houbunsha's Manga Time Kirara Max magazine. The series follows a high school girl name Cocoa Hoto who begins living at the Rabbit House café and making new friends. The first season aired in Japan between April 10, 2014, and June 26, 2014, and was simulcast by Crunchyroll. Sentai Filmworks have licensed the series in North America. A second season, co-produced by Kinema Citrus, aired between October 10, 2015, and December 26, 2015. A third season, animated by Encourage Films, aired in Japan between October 10, 2020, and December 26, 2020.

Series overview

Episode list

Is the Order a Rabbit? (2014)

Is the Order a Rabbit?? (2015–19)

Is the Order a Rabbit? BLOOM (2020)

Home releases

Japanese

English

References

External links

Is the Order a Rabbit